Ute Mountain, also known as Ute Peak or Sleeping Ute Mountain (Ute: Wisuv Káruv, Navajo: Dził Naajiní), is a peak within the Ute Mountains, a small mountain range in the southwestern corner of Colorado. It is on the northern edge of the Ute Mountain Ute Tribe Reservation. The Reservation forms the southwestern corner of the state and of Montezuma County.

Nomenclature for this peak and its range varies. The highest peak is sometimes known as Sleeping Ute Mountain; the entire range is also identified as one large mountain, called Sleeping Ute Mountain, on some maps;
and the range is sometimes called the Sleeping Ute Mountains.  All of these forms of the mountain's name and of the range's name can be found on various USGS maps, databases and reports.

Despite being much lower than Colorado's highest peaks, Ute Mountain is the eighth most topographically prominent peak in the state, due to this isolation. It is also notable for its large local relief in all directions, especially its rise of roughly 4,250 ft (1,295 m) over the Montezuma Valley to the southeast.

The Sleeping Ute is said to resemble a Ute chief lying on his back with arms folded across his chest. The mountains were valued as a sacred place by the Weeminuche Ute band. It is still a sacred place to their descendants, the Ute Mountain Ute Tribe and still plays a role in their ceremonies as indicated by the "Sundance Ground" on some topographical maps nestled between The Knees and Horse Peak (ribcage).

Originally, the northern part of the mountains were outside the reservation boundaries as reduced following a series of treaties in the late 19th century, but a trade of land now in Mesa Verde National Park, approximately 15 miles east, for federal land on the mountain, allowed the reservation boundary to be extended north to McElmo Creek and encompass the entire mountain range. In particular, this means that recreational access to the range by outsiders is severely restricted. Few roads or trails are found in the mountains, although radio towers and water tanks have been built, and a road along Cottonwood Wash from Towaoc nearly reaches the summit of Ute Peak.

Legend
A Ute Indian legend
describes the Sleeping Ute as the sleeping form of a "Great Warrior God who was also known as a chief" who fell asleep while recovering from wounds received in a great battle with "the Evil Ones". Various other forms of the legend can be found.

Visual profile 

Easily identified features of the profile include the following (north to south):

 Head - the profile of Marble Mountain provides readily recognized facial features while a feathered headdress can be seen tapering north from Black Mountain and Marble Mountain..
 Crossed Arms – Ute Peak is the highest, the most prominent and easternmost peak in the Ute Mountains
 Ribcage – Horse Mountain to the east and the twin peaks Black Mountain/Ute Mountain to the west form a recognizable ribcage.
 Knees – Hermano Mountain or "The Knees" are obviously the knees of the figure.
 Toes –
 East Toe is a relatively small, sharp and prominent igneous protrusion at the south-eastern end of the Ute Mountains proportioned and perfectly placed to complete the figure from the east.
 West Toe, a second protrusion, has a very similar profile and is perfectly placed to complete the figure from the west.

The illusion of a reclining figure is further reinforced by its symmetry. The figure is nearly as complete seen from the west as from the east.

Region

Though on the southwestern fringe of the original Rocky Mountain home of the Ute Tribe, the Sleeping Ute is the most prominent feature of the high-desert Ute Mountain Ute Reservation. The only town on the Reservation, Towaoc, lies at the feet of the figure and is home to most of the Reservation's population. As the Reservation capital, Towaoc is the Ute Mountain Ute tribal headquarters.

The Ute Mountain Ute Tribal Park adjoins Mesa Verde National Park to the east of the mountains. The Mesa and the Sleeping Ute share equal prominence as regional landmarks.

McElmo Creek and Canyon Of The Ancients National Monument form the northern terminus of the Ute Mountains and the Reservation.

Geology 
The Ute Mountains were formed by intrusion of igneous rocks at about 72 million years (Late Cretaceous), concurrent doming, and subsequent erosion. The most common type of igneous rock is porphyritic hornblende diorite, but rock types present range from gabbro to granite. Forms of intrusions include laccoliths, stocks, dikes, and sills. One dike extends north to McElmo Creek and can be examined at a roadside there. The igneous rocks intrude a sedimentary section of Jurassic and Cretaceous rocks and the youngest rocks intruded are in the Point Lookout Sandstone.

The intrusions are similar in form and rock type to those in other Colorado Plateau mountain ranges, such as the La Plata Mountains to the northeast of here, and the Rico Mountains north of Dolores, Colorado in Colorado, and the Henry Mountains,  the La Sal Mountains and the Abajo Mountains, all to the west in Utah. The intrusions at these three Utah occurrences are younger at about 20 to 30 million years in age. The Ute Mountains and the similar Carrizo Mountains, nearby in Arizona, lie within a southwest extension of the Colorado Mineral Belt, but no ore deposits are known to be associated with these igneous rocks.

Sedimentary units are listed below, from youngest to oldest:

Formations of Cretaceous age
 Point Lookout Sandstone (the oldest formation of the Mesa Verde Group)
 Mancos Shale
 Dakota Sandstone
 Burro Canyon Formation
Formations of Jurassic age
 Morrison Formation
 Bluff Sandstone (formerly called the Junction Creek Sandstone)
 Summerville Formation
 Entrada Sandstone
 Navajo Sandstone

In some areas the soft lower unit of the Entrada weathers into characteristic rounded forms, commonly called hoodoos. The underlying Navajo weathers into rough, rounded surfaces, commonly pitted, and usually forms cliffs.

See also

List of Colorado mountain ranges
List of Colorado mountain summits
List of Colorado fourteeners
List of Colorado 4000 meter prominent summits
List of the most prominent summits of Colorado
List of Colorado county high points

References

Further reading

External links

Mountains of Colorado
Mountains of Montezuma County, Colorado
North American 3000 m summits
Religious places of the indigenous peoples of North America